Sittichai Musbu-ngor is a professional footballer from Thailand. He is currently playing for Navy in Thai League 2 as an attacking midfielder.

Personal life
Sittichai has a brother, Sirisak Musbu-ngor, who is also a professional footballer.

External links
 

1984 births
Living people
Sittichai Masbu-ngor
Association football forwards
Sittichai Masbu-ngor
Sittichai Masbu-ngor
Sittichai Masbu-ngor